Lolis Edward Elie (died 2017) was an American lawyer in New Orleans who was very active in the Civil Rights Movement.

His son is writer and filmmaker Lolis Eric Elie.

Legacy 
Elie is credited as a major force in the fight to desegregate New Orleans, handling many of the significant cases in the local process.

Personal life 
Elie was Catholic, and buried in a Catholic funeral at St Augustine Catholic Church.

His son is writer, documentary filmmaker, and food historian Lolis Eric Elie.

References 

2017 deaths
African-American Catholics
Roman Catholic activists